Liga Melaka or Malacca League is a state level football league held in Malacca, Malaysia. The league is managed by the football authority in Malacca, the Melaka United Soccer Association (MUSA).

A total of 32 clubs will compete in the three divisions of Melaka League from 2019 season.

History
The earliest recorded state football league took place in Malacca  was in 1929 where the team that won the league at that year was Malacca Chinese FA.

In 1936 there are five teams participated in the league which are Rangers, Police, CFA I, CFA II and G. Services. In 1965 there are seven teams participated in the league which are New Market SC, Hakka Association PWD/Survey SC, 1-10 Gurkha Rifles, Malacca Police, Kilat Club, Medicals SC and 1st Battalion Scots Guards. Unfortunately the winners for both years are unknown.

In 2014, Malacca Football Association was undergoing restructuring where Liga Melaka was relaunched for 2014 season onwards with two divisions. In 2015, a total of 44 clubs compete in the league where the first division consist of 16 clubs divided into two groups while the second division with 28 clubs divided into four groups.

At the end of 2016, MUSA has announced that the 2017 season will start on 26 February 2017 instead of late year. A third division was introduced by MUSA for 2017 Melaka League season where a total number of clubs in first and second divisions were reduced for the elite few where the rest will play in the third division. A total of 43 clubs will compete in 2017 season. A knockout cup tournament of Piala FA Liga Melaka was also introduced to be played at the start of the season featuring all three divisions.

Piala FA Liga Melaka
For 2017 season, MUSA has introduced a knockout cup tournament called Piala FA Liga Melaka which will be play at the start of the season featuring all three divisions of Liga Melaka.

Former clubs
Air Merbau
All Star United
Arena SW Corp
Bawean
Bemban Utama
Gajah Berang
K.A.T.A
KBBPNM
Kiddo-Kickers
KMB United
MBFA
Melayu Melaka
MS JKR
Prestige
Sang Helang
Selat
Taman Wira

Melaka Open Veteran League
MUSA also held other league such as Melaka Open Veteran League which consist of 16 teams.  The players qualified for this league must be over 40 years old.

Champions

Current league system
Division 1

Division 2

Division 3

Malacca FA Cup

External links
 Official Facebook

References

 
Melaka United F.C.
4